Rose Park is a suburb with a population of 1,374 in the South Australian capital city of Adelaide. Rose Park is a leafy, tree-lined and wealthy inner suburb containing a number of historical and contemporary attractions. Much of the area's 19th-century housing stock has been recognised with heritage protection.

Part of the Burnside Council, it is bounded to the north by Kensington Road, to the east by Prescott Terrace, to the south by Dulwich Avenue and to the west by Fullarton Road. The area is mainly residential in nature, with commercial buildings along Fullarton Road, Kensington Road, and Dulwich Avenue. This places it on the very edge of the Adelaide Park Lands, bordering Victoria Park.

History
Laid out in 1878 on part section 262, Hundred of Adelaide by the South Australia Company. Named after Sir John Rose, chairman of the company for fourteen years in the latter half of the nineteenth century. Rose Park Post Office opened on 1 October 1946 but was renamed Norwood South in 1966.

Heritage-listed buildings

The Gartrell Memorial Church, located on Prescott Terrace between Alexandra and Grant Avenues, was designed in 1914 by architect Herbert Jory in the Gothic Revival style when he was in the architectural practice of Woods, Bagot & Jory, and built as a Methodist church in 1915. Jory also designed the Gartrell Memorial Schoolroom. The church and its hall were state heritage-listed in November 1989, with the hall estimated to be built at a later date, probably 1925.

The church was named after James Gartrell, who was a parishioner and benefactor. He paid for the pipe organ and contributed generously to its building.

Residents

This compares with 2,663 in 2001 (when the census area included adjoining Dulwich) with a very slight decrease in population between the 1996 and 2001 censuses.

Notable residents include Albert Fryar and Andrew Fairweather.

Education
Rose Park Primary School is located in Rose Park. The Adelaide Japanese Community School, Inc. (ACJS; アデレード日本語補習授業校 Aderēdo Nihongo Hoshū Jugyō Kō), a part-time Japanese educational programme, holds its classes in Rose Park Primary School.

Politics
, Rose Park is part of the state electoral district of Dunstan, which has since March 2018 has been held by Steven Marshall, also Premier of South Australia.

In federal politics, the suburb has been part of the Division of Sturt since 20 July 2018, and has been represented by Liberal MP James Stevens since the 2019 election. Rose Park formerly in the division of Adelaide) and was, from 2004 until her retirement in 2019, represented by Labor MP Kate Ellis.

References and notes

External links

Rose Park Primary School

Suburbs of Adelaide
1878 establishments in Australia